MOIL (earlier known as Manganese Ore (India) Limited) is a miniratna state-owned manganese ore mining company headquartered in Nagpur, India. With a market share of 50%, it is the largest producer of manganese ore in India. MOIL operates 11 mines in adjoining districts of Maharashtra and Madhya Pradesh. It has been ranked #486 among the 500 top companies in India and 9th in the Mines and Metals Sector of the Fortune India 500 list for 2011.

In December 2010, the Government of India divested about 20% of its equity through an IPO. Of the 20%, the Indian Government's share will be 10%, and the Governments of Maharashtra and the Government of Madhya Pradesh will each divest 5% of the total equity. The central government holds 54% and the two state governments hold about 11% shares in MOIL. and the public holds about 35% shares.

The shares were listed in 2011 at Rs. 440, went down to a low of Rs. 188 on 13 July and 15 February, before recovering currently to Rs. 351. The company issued one bonus share for every share held on 28 Sep 2017. The share price was about Rs. 140 in January 2021.

History
MOIL was originally set up as "Central Province Prospecting Syndicate" in the year 1896 in the region of Maharashtra and Madhya Pradesh. It was later renamed as "Central Provinces Manganese Ore Company Limited (CPMO)" in 1935. In 1962, the Government of India took over the mining activities from CPMO. Then, Manganese Ore (India) Limited was formed with 51% stake held between the Government of India and the Maharashtra and Madhya Pradesh State governments. The other 49% was retained with CPMO.
In 1977, the balance of 49% was acquired from CPMO, and MOIL became a 100% state-owned enterprise.

Mines
Eight of MOIL's eleven mines are underground mines (Kandri, Munsar, Beldongri, Gumgaon, Chikla, Balaghat and Ukwa mines) and three are opencast mines (Dongri Buzurg, Sitapatore, and Tirodi). Its Balaghat mine is the largest of the 11 mines and the deepest at 383 metres.

Products
MOIL excavates manganese dioxide ore from its mines. The production was 1.3 million tonne in 2020. Various grades of the ore are used for production of manganese metal and alloys such as ferro-manganese and silicon-manganese. Refined manganese dioxide is used as a supplement in cattle feed, in fertilizers and in chemical industry. MOIL refines the ore to produce 1,000 tonne electrolytic grade used in dry batteries. MOIL uses its ore to produce 11,000 tonne of ferro-manganese. The total sales were Rs. 16.3 billion in 2018.19 but only Rs. 12.2 billion in 2019–20.

MOIL also produces 30 MW electricity by wind mills.

See More
 Fortune India 500
 List of companies of India

References

External links
 Official Website

 

Government-owned companies of India
Mining companies of India
Companies based in Maharashtra
Mining in Maharashtra
1962 establishments in Maharashtra
Indian companies established in 1962
Companies listed on the National Stock Exchange of India
Companies listed on the Bombay Stock Exchange